Ivory Tower is a small peak rising to about ,  east of Fadden Peak, between the Harold Byrd Mountains and the Bender Mountains in Antarctica. The peak was visited by a United States Antarctic Research Program – Arizona State University geological party, 1977–78, and was named because of its composition of nearly all white marble.

References

Mountains of Marie Byrd Land